Worming may refer to:
 Deworming,  the giving of an anthelmintic drug to a human or animal to rid them of internal parasites, including helminths
 Oculolinctus, eyeball licking
Worm, parcel and serve, the act of applying protection to standing rigging on a boat

See also 

 Worm (disambiguation)